This list of LGBT-related awards is an index to articles on notable awards related to LGBT (lesbian, gay, bisexual and transgender) media, competitions, film and literature.

General

Film

Literary awards

See also

 Lists of awards
 List of gay pornography awards

References

 
LGBT
 
LGBT-related lists